Anubrata Mondal (born 1 April 1960) is an Indian politician, who belongs to All India Trinamool Congress, he is known to be close aide of Chief Minister of West Bengal, Mamata Banerjee. He is currently serving as President of Birbhum District Trinamool Congress. He was also the Chairman of Tarapith Development Authority until 2020.

Controversies
On 11 August 2022, he was arrested by Central Bureau of Investigation after interrogation in West Bengal Cow-smuggling scam. On 12 August 2022, he was brought to Kolkata from Asansol after presenting him in the court.
On 7th March 2023, ED took him to Delhi and put him into Tihar Jail.

References 

1960 births
Living people
Indian politicians